Kingston Wildcats School of Basketball is a community basketball development club originating from Kingston that compete in the Surrey League and Basketball England National League. The club acts as "school of basketball" for players in the Royal Borough of Kingston and Surrey with teams for players between the ages of 8 and 16.  The club also runs a senior men's team and its practices and home fixtures take place at Chessington School.

History
The team was founded in 1983 and played as Tolworth Reckers in the Surrey League until 1994 when as Chessington Wildcats they moved up to the regional NBL Division Three South.  In 1996 they were promoted to the national NBL Division 2.

The team changed their name to Kingston Wildcats  in an attempt to improve its profile in 1998 and this coupled with some shrewd recruiting culminated in winning the Division Two Play off final at Wembley beating the highly fancied Manchester Magic. An automatic place in Division One was initially denied due to the capacity at Chessington Sports Centre being below the 500 stipulated for the division.

In 2000 to take their place in Division One they moved to Tolworth Recreation Centre.  TRC had hosted top flight basketball in the 70's and 80's when Kingston Kings were one of the best teams in the country, however a large investment by both Kingston Council and Kingston Wildcats was required to get the centre's equipment up to the required standard.

The club withdrew from the EBL prior to the 2006/07 season due to financial problems, and returned to the Surrey League.  In 2007/08 the club entered the National Founders Cup, getting to the final where they lost by one point to London Lithuanians.  In 2008/09 a win against King's Lynn Ironwolf in the final of same competition gave the club their second trophy on the national stage.  In 2009/10 an injury depleted team lost in the final once again to London Lithuanians this time by one point.  In 2010/11 Kingston reached the final again, but lost 79 -70 to London Rocco's Raiders.

Season-by-season National League records

DNQ denotes Did Not Qualify.

National Founders Cup

The Founders Cup is a national cup competition for clubs not playing in the national leagues.  We first entered as Chessington Wildcats whilst in a regional league in 1994.  There was then a long break while we were in the full national league.  In 2007 Steve Rich and Mark Bottiglia organised a return to this competition.  Coached by Phil Gunner the team made four finals in a row from 2008 to 2011.

Trojans Wildcats Trophy

In 2009 club president Steve Burnett instigated the Trojans Wildcats Trophy.  This was to become an annual game between Kingston Wildcats and Tile Hill Trojans from the Warwickshire League.  The 2009 game was played at Warwick University, moving to Chessington Sports Centre in 2010.  The series which is currently sponsored by Alto Clothing Ltd, now alternates between Surrey and Warwickshire venues.

External links
Official Kingston Wildcats website
Surrey Basketball League
Basketball England National League
Basketball teams in England
Sport in the Royal Borough of Kingston upon Thames
Basketball teams established in 1983
1983 establishments in England